Macrobathra fasciata is a moth in the family Cosmopterigidae. It was described by Walsingham in 1891. It is found in Namibia, South Africa, Gambia and Zimbabwe.

References

Natural History Museum Lepidoptera generic names catalog

Macrobathra
Moths described in 1891